The  is a river in Hokkaidō, Japan. At , it is the second-longest river on the island (after the Ishikari) and the fourth-longest in the country (after the Shinano, Tone, and Ishikari). A Class A river, the Teshio is the northernmost major river in Japan, and has been designated Hokkaidō Heritage. Matsuura Takeshirō is said to have come up with the name "Hokkaidō" during his exploration of the river's interior.

Name
The name of the river derives from the Ainu , meaning "river full of fishing weirs", perhaps because of rocks dotted across the river in such a shape. Due to works on the river in recent years the rocks in its middle course that perhaps inspired the name themselves largely no longer exist.

Geography
The river's source is at Mount Teshio, highest of the Kitami Mountains. The lower  are, unusually, unbroken by dams and weirs and can be navigated uninterrupted.

 Kamikawa Subprefecture： Bifuka, Kenbuchi, Nakagawa, Nayoro, Otoineppu, Shibetsu, Shimokawa, Wassamu
 Rumoi Subprefecture： Teshio
 Sōya Subprefecture： Horonobe, Toyotomi, Wakkanai
As of the 2010 census, some 122,000 people lived in the basin.

History
It is believed the first humans arrived in the Teshio River system approximately fifteen thousand years ago. The first survey of the river was conducted by three men under , retainer of the Matsumae Domain, in Kansei 9 (1797), from its lower stretches as far as Otoineppu. In Ansei 4 (1857), Matsuura Takeshirō spent twenty-four days exploring the Teshio River, starting from its mouth; he subsequently wrote up his account of the river and those who lived along it in his . It was from the tales he heard from an Ainu elder living in the area of Otoineppu that Matsuura conceived of the name "Hokkaidō".

After major floods in 1898, a need was identified for flood mitigation measures all over the island. After detailed surveying of the river between 1906 and 1908, and further flooding, a flood control plan for the Teshio River was first drafted in Taishō 8 (1919). There ensued a programme of bank reinforcement, embankment construction, and channel switching. After flooding continued to adversely affect the local farmers' potatoes, the Shōwa era saw further channel switching and the excavation of new waterways. A typhoon in 1981 and the heaviest rainfall since the war saw an area of  inundated, with damage to 546 houses, while the typhoons of 2016 left 72 homes flooded.

Economy
In the upstream areas of Shibetsu and Shimokawa, the lumber industry exploits the abundant forests of the interior. The Nayoro basin between Nayoro and Bifuka marks the northern limit of rice cultivation. Downstream, on the Teshio Plain, there is dairy farming, while near the river mouth there is salmon and trout fishing and also the prefecture's most intensive harvesting of shijimi clams. Water sports include canoeing—there is an annual race .

Ecology
The mountainous area upstream extends to the Daisetsuzan National Park, while Teshiodake Prefectural Natural Park has many alpine plants. Fauna of the river system include the Tōkyō lesser pigmy shrew, migratory White-tailed eagle (a Natural Monument), Steller's sea eagle (Natural Monument), Taiga bean goose (Natural Monument), and Sakhalin taimen. The  and  marshes are an important resting place for migratory waterfowl, and the Sarobetsu wetlands have been designated a Ramsar Site, the  being a tributary of the Teshio.

See also

 List of Natural Monuments of Japan (Hokkaidō)
 List of Ramsar sites in Japan
 Tondenhei
 Wildlife Protection Areas in Japan

References

Rivers of Hokkaido
Rivers of Japan